Oldřich Daněk  (January 16, 1927 – September 3, 2000) was a Czech dramatist, writer, director and screenwriter.

After graduating from high school in Ostrava, he studied at the Theatre Faculty of the Academy of Performing Arts in Prague (DAMU). From 1945, while still studying, he acted at the Divadlo Petra Bezruce in Ostrava. After completing his studies he became director of the Klicperovo Divadlo in Hradec Králové. From 1954 he was the artistic director/conductor of the F. X. Šaldy theatre  in Liberec. From 1957 he worked at the Filmové Studio Barrandov, first as a film script author, and then later as a director. From 1973 onwards he devoted his life full-time to writing.

His dramas are predominantly moralistic; besides film and TV serials, he also wrote radio plays for broadcast.

Works

Drama 
 Umění odejít, 1955
 Čtyřicátý osmý, 1956
 Pohled do očí, 1959
 Svatba sňatkového podvodníka, 1961
 Máte rádi blázny?, 1962
 Čtyřicet omylů Herodesových, sometimes titled Čtyřicet zlosynů a jedno neviňátko, 1966
 Vrátím se do Prahy, 1969
 Dva na koni, jeden na oslu, 1971
 Hvězda jménem Praha, 1973
 Válka vypukne po přestávce, 1976
 Střelec, 1978
 Bitva na Moravském poli, 1979
 Vévodkyně valdštejnských vojsk, 1980
 Zpráva o chirurgii města N., 1981
 Životopis mého strýce, 1983
 Zdaleka ne tak ošklivá, jak se původně zdálo, 1983
 Vy jste Jan, 1987

Prose 
 Král utíká z boje, 1967
 Únosce: Podivný den herce Krapka, 1967
 Král bez přilby, 1971
 Vražda v Olomouci, 1972, a novel
 Žhářky a požárnice, 1980
 Nedávno...: Útržky z běhu času, 1985, short stories

Film 
 Zde jsou lvi, 1958, screenplay and direction
 Ošklivá slečna, 1959, screenplay
 Prosím nebudit, 1962, screenplay and direction
 Spanilá jízda, 1963
 Konec agenta W4C prostřednictvím psa pana Foustky, 1967
 Královský omyl, 1968, on the theme of his novel Král utíká z boje
 Byl jednou jeden dům, 1974, television series
 Dnes v jednom domě, 1978, television series

Directed for television 
 Tři tuny prachu, 1960
 Lov na mamuta, 1963
 Muž v pralese, 1971, for television
 Raněný lučištník, 1974, for television
 Dva útržky ze života muže, 1976, for television
 Druhá první dáma, 1980, for television
 Žena z Korinta 1986, for television
 Španělé v Praze1988, for television
 Opouštět Petrohrad, 1990, for television
 Pilát Pontský, onoho dne, 1991
 Záskok pro Sissi, 1995

Screenplays for television 
 Prometheus, 1958
 Pařížský kat, 1968
 Kardinál Zabarella, 1968,
 Břetislav a Jitka, 1974
 Cesta na Borneo, 1983
 Záviš a Kunhuta, 1985
 Bankovní dům Daubner, 1989

Radio plays 
 Dialog v předvečer soudu, 1967
 Dialog s doprovodem děl,1967
 Jak se máte Vondrovi?, more parts
 Rozhovor v Delfách
 Blbý had
 Přepadení Národní banky
 Rudolfinská noc
 Vzpomínka na Hamleta

External links 

1927 births
2000 deaths
Czech male dramatists and playwrights
20th-century Czech dramatists and playwrights
20th-century male writers